Perrine Simon-Nahum (born in 1960) is a contemporary French historian.

Biography 
She is the daughter of Pr Pierre Simon.

Holder of a doctorate in history (1989), Simon-Nahum is responsible for research at the CNRS (Centre de recherches historiques of the EHESS, Centre d'Approches Historiques du Monde contemporain) and associate member of the CRIA-EHESS. Specializing in contemporary history, her research focuses on Judaism and the history of Jews in France.

In 1989, she published a compilation of texts by Raymond Aron entitled Essais sur la condition juive contemporaine (reissued in 2007). She codirected a Dictionnaire critique de la République in 2002. At the same time, she is director of series at Éditions Grasset.

Publications 
 (éd.), Choice of texts and annotation of Raymond Aron, Essais sur la condition juive contemporaine, Paris, Éditions de Fallois, 1989. ; reissued 2007.  
 La cité investie. La science du judaïsme français et la République, Paris, Éditions du Cerf, "Bibliothèque franco-allemande", 1992. 
 (ed.), Les ombres de l'histoire. Crime et châtiment au XIXe siècle, texts collected by Michelle Perrot, Paris, Flammarion, 2001.  ; reissued 2003. 
 (ed.) with Vincent Duclert and Christophe Prochasson, Dictionnaire critique de la République, Paris, Flammarion, 2002. 
 (ed.) with Vincent Duclert and Christophe Prochasson, Il s'est passé quelque chose le 21 avril 2002, Paris, Éditions Denoël, « Médiations », 2003. 
 (ed.), with Vincent Duclert, L'affaire Dreyfus: les événements fondateurs, Paris: A. Colin, 2009..
 André Malraux: L'engagement politique au XXe siècle,  Paris, Armand Colin, 2010. 
 Les Juifs et la modernité: l'héritage du judaïsme et les sciences de l'homme en France au XIXe siècle, Paris: Albin Michel, 2018..

References

External links 
 Perrine Simon-Nahum on Cespra
 Perrine Simon-Nahum on ITEM
 Perrine Simon-Nahum on France Culture
 Perrine Simon-Nahum on Akadem

1960 births
Living people
21st-century French historians
Women historians
French historiographers
Academic staff of the School for Advanced Studies in the Social Sciences